Ramón Alberto Aguirre Suárez (18 October 1944 – 29 May 2013) was an Argentine footballer who played as a defender. He was mainly known for being a part of the successful Estudiantes de La Plata team of 1967–1970.

Career
Aguirre Suárez made his name in Osvaldo Zubeldía's Estudiantes as an often violent full-back, playing alongside the more refined Raúl Madero. When Estudiantes conquered the 1967 Metropolitano title and was runner-up in the Nacional of the same year, it qualified for the 1968 Copa Libertadores, which it won. Estudiantes then engaged Manchester United F.C. for the 1968 Intercontinental Cup, which it won 2-1 on aggregate.

Estudiantes then proceeded to win the 1969 and 1970 editions of the Libertadores, as well as the 1968 edition of the Interamerican Cup in a three-legged final against the reigning CONCACAF title-holders, Mexican club Toluca.

Estudiantes lost the 1969 Intercontinental Cup against A.C. Milan, and the 1970 edition against Feyenoord. Following a violent Intercontinental match against Milan played in Boca's stadium in Buenos Aires, the entire team was arrested on orders from Argentine President Juan Carlos Onganía. Goalkeeper Alberto Poletti was suspended for life (he was later pardoned) and did time in jail. Aguirre Suárez and Manera endured jail time and suspensions. Aguirre Suárez had scored in the match; Milan player Nestor Combin argued that Aguirre Suárez's elbow broke a bone in his face. 

After Estudiantes lost the 1971 Copa Libertadores final, several players were transferred. Aguirre Suárez played for Granada CF in 1971/72 and later in 1973/74, conforming a strong defensive line alongside Uruguayan (and former Libertadores foe) Julio Montero Castillo. He also played for UD Salamanca before retiring in 1975.

In 1977, he came out of retirement to play four games for Club Atlético Lanús.

Honours
Estudiantes
Copa Libertadores (3): 1968, 1969, 1970
Primera División Argentina (1): Metropolitano 1967
Copa Intercontinental (1): 1968
Copa Interamericana (1): 1969

Post retirement

After retirement, Aguirre Suárez remained linked to football, coaching teams in Tucumán and elsewhere, and working in schools in the La Plata area.

References

External links
 There Is No Force Like Him - The Wild World Of Ramón Aguirre Suárez Part One
 
 La Nación profile
 Intercontinental Cup 1968
 Diario Hoy article

1944 births
2013 deaths
Sportspeople from Misiones Province
Estudiantes de La Plata footballers
Club Atlético Lanús footballers
Granada CF footballers
UD Salamanca players
Argentine Primera División players
Copa Libertadores-winning players
Argentine expatriate footballers
Argentine footballers
Expatriate footballers in Spain
Granada CF managers
Argentine prisoners and detainees
Prisoners and detainees of Argentina
Association football defenders
Argentine football managers